C. similis may refer to:

 Catocala similis, similar underwing, a moth of North America
 Callinectes similis, the lesser blue crab or dwarf crab, of the western Atlantic

See also